Darban-e Salah (also Romanized as Darban-e Şalāḩ; also known as Darband Şalāḩ) is a village in Gowharan Rural District, Gowharan District, Bashagard County, Hormozgan Province, Iran. At the 2006 census, its population was 35, in 7 families.

References 

Populated places in Bashagard County